The Cortez Historic District is a U.S. historic district (designated as such on March 16, 1995) located in Cortez, Florida. The district is bounded by Cortez Road, 119th Street W, Sarasota Bay and 124th Street Court W.

References

External links

National Register of Historic Places in Manatee County, Florida
Historic districts on the National Register of Historic Places in Florida